The Uluru Statement from the Heart is a 2017 petition by Australian Aboriginal and Torres Strait Islander leaders to change the constitution of Australia to improve the representation of Indigenous Australians.

The statement was released on 26 May 2017 by delegates to the First Nations National Constitutional Convention, held over four days near Uluru in Central Australia. The convention was held after the 16-member Referendum Council (appointed by prime minister Malcolm Turnbull and leader of the opposition Bill Shorten on 7 December 2015), had travelled around the country and met with over 1,200 people. The statement was issued after the convention and calls for a "First Nations Voice" in the Australian Constitution and a Makarrata Commission to supervise a process of "agreement-making" and truth-telling between the Australian Government and Aboriginal and Torres Strait Islander peoples.

The statement references the second part of the 1967 referendum, which (after passing) brought about changes to the Constitution of Australia to include Aboriginal and Torres Strait Islander people in population counts, and gave the Federal Government the power to make laws for Indigenous Australians in the states.

In October 2017 Turnbull, his Attorney-General George Brandis and Indigenous Affairs Minister Nigel Scullion rejected the statement, saying that they did not think that the "radical" constitutional change would be supported by a majority of Australians.
In May 2022 the Uluru Statement was endorsed by Labor leader Anthony Albanese on the occasion of his 2022 election victory.

Background
The 16-member Referendum Council was jointly appointed by the prime minister, Malcolm Turnbull, and Leader of the Opposition, Bill Shorten, on 7 December 2015. The council was to advise the government on steps towards a referendum to recognise Aboriginal and Torres Strait Islander peoples in the Australian Constitution. It built on extensive work by the Expert Panel on Constitutional Recognition of Indigenous Australians and the Joint Select Committee on Constitutional Recognition of Aboriginal and Torres Strait Islander Peoples. The council was made up of Indigenous and non-Indigenous community leaders and co-chaired by Patrick Dodson, and Mark Leibler AC. Dodson resigned from the council on 2 March 2016 after being endorsed by the Australian Labor Party for a vacant Western Australian Senate seat, and was replaced by serving Council member Pat Anderson .

In October 2016, the Council released the "Discussion Paper on Constitutional Recognition of Aboriginal and Torres Strait Islander Peoples" to guide discussion. In the group's "Final Report", it was noted that matters outside the discussion papers' key themes were out of scope for the final recommendations. These themes were:
"Statement of acknowledgement"
"A federal power to make laws for Aboriginal and Torres Strait Islander peoples"
"A constitutional prohibition against racial discrimination"
"An Indigenous voice"
"Deleting section 25"

Over a six-month period the Council travelled to 12 different locations around Australia and met with over 1,200 Aboriginal and Torres Strait Islander representatives. The meetings resulted in a consensus document on constitutional recognition, the Uluru Statement from the Heart.

The First Nations National Constitutional Convention met over four days from 23 to 26 May 2017. Council member Megan Davis gave the first public reading of the statement at the conclusion of the 2017 First Nations National Constitutional Convention at Uluru. The convention was adopted by the 250 Aboriginal and Torres Strait Islander delegates.

Uluru Statement from the Heart

Text
The text of the Statement is as follows:

"We, gathered at the 2017 National Constitutional Convention, coming from all points of the southern sky, make this statement from the heart:

Our Aboriginal and Torres Strait Islander tribes were the first sovereign Nations of the Australian continent and its adjacent islands, and possessed it under our own laws and customs. This our ancestors did, according to the reckoning of our culture, from the Creation, according to the common law from 'time immemorial', and according to science more than 60,000 years ago.

This sovereignty is a spiritual notion: the ancestral tie between the land, or 'mother nature', and the Aboriginal and Torres Strait Islander peoples who were born therefrom, remain attached thereto, and must one day return thither to be united with our ancestors. This link is the basis of the ownership of the soil, or better, of sovereignty. It has never been ceded or extinguished, and co-exists with the sovereignty of the Crown.

How could it be otherwise? That peoples possessed a land for sixty millennia and this sacred link disappears from world history in merely the last two hundred years?

With substantive constitutional change and structural reform, we believe this ancient sovereignty can shine through as a fuller expression of Australia’s nationhood.

Proportionally, we are the most incarcerated people on the planet. We are not an innately criminal people. Our children are aliened from their families at unprecedented rates. This cannot be because we have no love for them. And our youth languish in detention in obscene numbers. They should be our hope for the future.

These dimensions of our crisis tell plainly the structural nature of our problem. This is the torment of our powerlessness.

We seek constitutional reforms to empower our people and take a rightful place in our own country. When we have power over our destiny our children will flourish. They will walk in two worlds and their culture will be a gift to their country.

We call for the establishment of a First Nations Voice enshrined in the Constitution.

Makarrata is the culmination of our agenda: the coming together after a struggle. It captures our aspirations for a fair and truthful relationship with the people of Australia and a better future for our children based on justice and self-determination.

We seek a Makarrata Commission to supervise a process of agreement-making between governments and First Nations and truth-telling about our history.

In 1967 we were counted, in 2017 we seek to be heard. We leave base camp and start our trek across this vast country. We invite you to walk with us in a movement of the Australian people for a better future."

Note on Makarrata  Makarrata is a Yolngu word "describing a process of conflict resolution, peacemaking and justice", or "a coming together after a struggle", and members said Makarrata "captures our aspirations for a fair and truthful relationship with the people of Australia", and the Makarrata Commission would "supervise a process of agreement-making between governments and First Nations".

Artwork
In keeping with the tradition of the Yirrkala bark petitions and the Barunga statement, the Uluru Statement was made in the form of a work of art. The statement is placed in the centre which is where the power resides. Surrounding the statement are signatures of over 250 delegates who attended the conference and reached consensus. 100 first nations are represented in the statement by signers who included the name of their nation.

The artwork tells the story of two Tjukurpa creation stories of the traditional owners of Uluru, the Aṉangu people. One tells how the Uluru landscape was shaped by a fight to the death at the Mutitjulu Rockhole between Kuniya, the woma python with eggs from the north east, at the top left, and Liru, the poisonous snake from the south west, at the bottom left. The other tells the story of the Mala people, represented by the Rufous hare-wallaby who, while holding a ceremony at the top of Uluru, became involved in a dispute with men who came from the west. The men left and created Kurpany, the devil dingo, represented by the dog prints.

The Final Report of the Referendum Council
The Final Report of the Referendum Council contains the following recommendations:

That a referendum be held to provide in the Australian Constitution for a representative body that gives Aboriginal and Torres Strait Islander First Nations a Voice to the Commonwealth Parliament. One of the specific functions of such a body, to be set out in legislation outside the Constitution, should include the function of monitoring the use of the heads of power in section 51 (xxvi) and section 122. The body will recognise the status of Aboriginal and Torres Strait Islander peoples as the first peoples of Australia.
That an extra-constitutional Declaration of Recognition be enacted by legislation passed by all Australian Parliaments, ideally on the same day, to articulate a symbolic statement of recognition to unify Australians.

The Final Report also notes that there are other matters of great importance to Australia's Indigenous peoples that can be more appropriately addressed outside the Constitution, realising the difficulties involved in Constitutional amendments, and recognising the principle of parliamentary supremacy. being: a statement of recognition; the establishment of a Makarrata Commission; a process to facilitate truth telling.

Presentation of Final Report and Uluru Statement to government
The Final Report of the Referendum Council was published on 30 June 2017, and sent to the Prime Minister, Malcolm Turnbull, and the leader of the opposition, Bill Shorten. It included the Uluru Statement as a preface, and the essay Rom Watangu – The Law of the Land by Galarrwuy Yunupingu, in which he describes Rom watangu as the overarching law of the land, which is "lasting and alive... my backbone".

The official painted and signed canvas artwork of the Statement was presented to the Prime Minister and the Leader of the Opposition on 5 August 2017, at the Garma Festival in north-east Arnhem Land in the Northern Territory. The Statement was also on display alongside musician John Butler at the Woodford Folk Festival in Queensland.

Initial government response
On 26 October 2017 Prime Minister Turnbull issued a joint statement with the Attorney-General, George Brandis, and the Indigenous Affairs Minister, Nigel Scullion, rejecting the statement. The statement said "The government does not believe such a radical change to our Constitution’s representative institutions has any realistic prospect of being supported by a majority of Australians in a majority of states".

Community response

Accolades and support
Support for the Uluru Statement from the Heart has grown since 2017. The Uluru Dialogue, the group that continues the work of the Uluru Statement from the Heart, is supported by prominent individuals, ordinary Australians from all walks of life, and a range of organisations from football clubs, medical and historical associations, through to banks and corporations such as Rio Tinto and Qantas.

In his 2019 induction speech to the Logies Hall of Fame, Journalist Kerry O'Brien voiced his support for the Uluru statement from the heart by calling on the Australian Parliament, during the current term, to "make a genuine effort to understand and support what is embodied in the Uluru Statement From the Heart". He added "the Uluru statement represents no threat to a single individual in any corner of this country, and certainly no threat to the integrity of Parliament. And if you're told that, don't you believe it. On the contrary, it will add much to the integrity of our nation".

In May 2019, 22 leaders in the Australian finance sector called for all Australians to embrace the Uluru Statement from the heart. Investment banker and philanthropist, John Wylie wrote in the Weekend Australian "We believe that accepting the call in the Uluru Statement for constitutional recognition will be a foundation stone of a modern Australia that’s a spiritually generous country truly at peace with itself and its history".

The Cape York Institute established the "From the Heart" education project in early 2020. The aim of the project is to increase awareness and understanding of the Uluru Statement from the Heart and a constitutionally-enshrined Voice to Parliament, and to show that it is a fair and practical reform.

Research commissioned by From the Heart and conducted by the C|T Group in June 2020 shows that a majority of Australians support a constitutionally-enshrined Voice to Parliament, and that this support has increased 7 percent in three months, from 49 percent in March to 56 percent in June 2020. There were 2000 participants in the survey, who were asked, "If a referendum were held today, how would you vote on the proposal to change the Constitution to set up a new body comprising Aboriginal and Torres Strait Islander people that gives advice to federal parliament on Aboriginal and Torres Strait Islander issues?”. Only 17 percent said they would vote no, down 3 percent since March 2020.

In November 2020, SBS Radio announced that their journalists have translated the Statement into more than 60 languages, and there are plans for it to be translated and recorded in more than 12 Indigenous languages.

The Uluru Statement was awarded the 2021 Sydney Peace Prize in May 2021.

Objections
In December 2017, traditional owners of Uluru, Anangu elders Alison Hunt and Donald Fraser, asked that the Reconciliation Council remove the word "Uluru" from the title, saying it was included without proper consultation. These issues have since been discussed and settled, with Central Land Council chair Sammy Wilson having given the group's blessing to use the name as part of the Uluru Statement from the Heart and its message to the Australian people.

Opposition to the key component of the Uluru Statement, the Indigenous Voice to Parliament, as well as some of the broader objectives of the Uluru Statement has been expressed by various individuals on both sides of the political divide.

NT Indigenous politician for the Country Liberal Party, Jacinta Nampijinpa Price (who was elected to the Australian Senate in May 2022), does not favour an amendment that divides along the line of race. Queensland Senator James McGrath (Liberal) has suggested that the Voice would damage equality and divide Australians by race.  Others have suggested that the idea of a Voice selected on racial grounds violates the principles of racial equality.  In June 2019, members of the conservative think tank Institute of Public Affairs wrote an opinion piece in The Sydney Morning Herald, saying that the proposal for the Voice "for some people and not others is... a violation of all principles of racial equality". Columnist Andrew Bolt has also criticised the objectives of the Uluru Statement.

Jordan Humphreys, a member of Socialist Alternative, argued in 2022 that while the Voice to Parliament wouldn't do much for working-class Indigenous people, there is a danger that it would help cohere a growing Indigenous elite into a conservatising force in Indigenous politics   Lidia Thorpe, later a Victorian Greens and Independent senator, was one of those walked out of the Convention and refused to sign the final document, due to the absence of the suggestion of a treaty. In October 2020, Adam Bandt, leader of the Australian Greens, signalled a shift in policy, saying that the Uluru Statement reforms list should be reordered, from "Voice, Treaty, Truth" to "Truth, Treaty, Voice".

Morrison government follow-up

The Joint Select Committee on Constitutional Recognition relating to Aboriginal and Torres Strait Islander Peoples was appointed in March 2018, co-chaired by Senator Patrick Dodson and Julian Leeser MP and comprising six Lower House and four Upper House representatives. It presented its final report on 29 November 2018. There were four recommendations in the report:In order to achieve a design for The Voice that best suits the needs and aspirations of Aboriginal and Torres Strait Islander peoples, the Committee recommends that the Australian Government initiate a process of co-design with Aboriginal and Torres Strait Islander peoples.
The Committee recommends that, following a process of co-design, the Australian Government consider, in a deliberate and timely manner, legislative, executive and constitutional options to establish The Voice.
The Committee recommends that the Australian Government support the process of truth-telling.
The Committee also recommends that the Australian Government consider the establishment, in Canberra, of a National Resting Place, for Aboriginal and Torres Strait Islander remains which could be a place of commemoration, healing and reflection.

The first recommendation, that of creating an Indigenous voice to government via "co-design process", was set in train by the establishment of the Senior Advisory Group (SAG), announced by Minister for Indigenous Australians Ken Wyatt in October 2019. The Senior Advisory Group is co-chaired by Professor Tom Calma , Chancellor of the University of Canberra, and Professor Dr Marcia Langton, Associate Provost at the University of Melbourne, and comprises a total of 20 leaders and experts from across the country. The government also said it would run a referendum during its present term about recognising Indigenous people in the constitution "should a consensus be reached and should it be likely to succeed". By March 2020 (around the beginning of the COVID-19 pandemic in Australia), the two other groups, National and Local and Regional, had been set up and had met at least once.

Albanese government follow-up

In May 2022, Uluru Statement was endorsed by incoming prime minister of Australia, Anthony Albanese, after the Labor Party was elected in the 2022 Australian federal election.

South Australian voice to parliament

In May 2021, South Australian Premier Steven Marshall announced his Government's intention to create the nation's first Indigenous Voice to parliament. After the  election of a state Labor government in 2022, premier Peter Malinauskas pledged to implement this state-based Voice to Parliament, as well as restarting treaty talks and greater investment in areas affecting Aboriginal people in the state. In July 2022 Dale Agius was appointed as the state's first Commissioner for First Nations Voice, with the role commencing in August. Kokatha elder Dr Roger Thomas would continue as Commissioner for Aboriginal Engagement for a further six months.

See also
Australian Aboriginal Sovereignty
Barunga Statement 
Constitutional recognition of Indigenous Australians
Indigenous voice to government, announced October 2019
Indigenous treaties in Australia
Northern Territory National Emergency Response (in regards to the oversight of Section 51 (xxvi))
Yirrkala bark petitions

Footnotes

References

Further reading

External links

Constitution of Australia
History of Indigenous Australians